Proper Dose is the fourth studio album by American pop punk band The Story So Far. It was released on September 21, 2018 via Pure Noise Records.

Background
Proper Dose was recorded at The Panda Studios in Fremont, California and The Farm Studios in Gibsons, British Columbia. Sam Pura served as produce and engineer with assistance from Tyler Shane Rodriquez, Karl Dicaire, and Ryan Ellery. The band's drummer Ryan Torf did additional engineering on the tracks. Eric Valentine mixed the recordings with assistance from Michael Carrey at Studio Topangadise in Topanga, California, before the album was mastered by Brian Gardner in Lake Arrowhead, California.

Release
The album was announced in late July 2018, coinciding with the release of lead single "Let It Go". Prior to the album's release, two further singles were both released on August 20, 2018: "Upside Down" and "Take Me as You Please". A music video for "Upside Down" was released on September 21. Proper Dose sold 18,248 pure copies in its first week of release and debuted at #19 on the Billboard 200 chart. In April 2019, the band went on an Australian tour with Basement.

Track listing
All songs written by The Story So Far.

Personnel
Personnel per booklet.

The Story So Far
 Parker Cannon – vocals
 Kevin Geyer – lead guitar
 Kelen Capener – bass
 Will Levy – rhythm guitar
 Ryan Torf – drums

Production and design
 Sam Pura – producer, engineer
 Tyler Shane Rodriquez – assistant
 Karl Dicaire – assistant
 Ryan Ellery – assistant
 Ryan Torf – additional engineering
 Eric Valentine – mixing
 Michael Carrey – assistant
 Brian Gardner – mastering
 Rob Carmichael – art direction
 The Story So Far – photography

Charts

References

External links
 Proper Dose at YouTube

2018 albums
The Story So Far (band) albums
Pure Noise Records albums